The Ayyubid dynasty ruled many parts of the Middle East and North Africa in the 12th, 13th and 14th centuries. The following is a list of Ayyubid rulers by county/province.

Sultans of Egypt
See Rulers of Islamic Egypt.

 Saladin, son of Ayyub, 1174–1193
 Al-Aziz Uthman, son of Saladin, 1193–1198
 Al-Mansur Nasir al-Din Muhammad, son of al-Aziz Uthman,  1198–1200
 Al-Adil Sayf al-Din Abu Bakr I (al-Adil I), brother of Saladin, 1200–1218
 Al-Kamil, son of al-Adil I, 1218–1238
 Al-Adil Sayf al-Din Abu Bakr II, son of al-Kamil, 1238–1240
 As-Salih Ayyub, son of al-Kamil, 1240–1249
 Al-Mu'azzam Turan-Shah, son of as-Salih Ayyub, 1249–1250
 Al-Ashraf Musa, presumed descendant of Saladin (nominal rule, under Mamluk sultan Aybak), 1250–1254.

Displaced in Egypt by the Mamluk sultanate, ruled briefly by Shajar al-Durr, widow of as-Salih Ayyub, and then Aybak, 1254.

Family Tree of the Ayyubid Sultans of Egypt

Sultans and Emirs of Damascus
See Rulers of Damascus.

 Saladin, 1174–1193
 Al-Afdal, son of Saladin, 1193–1196
 Al-Adil I, brother of Saladin, 1196–1218
 Al-Mu'azzam (Sharaf al-Din) Isa, son of al-Adil I, 1218–1227
 An-Nasir Dawud, son of al-Mu'azzam Isa, 1227–1229
 Al-Ashraf Musa, son of al-Adil I, 1229–1237
 As-Salih Ismail, son of al-Adil I, 1237–1238
 Al-Kamil, son of al-Adil I, 1238
 Al-Adil Sayf al-Din Abu Bakr II (al-Adil II), son of al-Kamil, 1238–1239
 As-Salih Ayyub, son of al-Adil I, 1239
 As-Salih Ismail (second rule), 1239–1245
 As-Salih Ayyub (second rule), 1245–1249
 Al-Muazzam Turanshah, son of as-Salih Ayyub, 1249–1250
 An-Nasir Yusuf, son of al-Aziz Muhammad, 1250–1260.

Takeover by Mongols, and then Mamluks following the battle of Ain Jalut, 1260.

Family Tree of the Rulers of Damascus

Emirs of Aleppo
See Rulers of Aleppo.

 Saladin, 1183–1193
 Az-Zahir Ghazi, son of Saladin, 1193–1216
 Al-Aziz Muhammad, son of az-Zahir Ghazi, 1216–1236
 An-Nasir Yusuf, son of al-Aziz Muhammad, 1236–1260.

Takeover by Mongols, and then Mamluks following the battle of Ain Jalut, 1260.

Emirs of Baalbek
See Baalbek, Middle Ages.

Shams al-Din Muhammad ibn al-Muqaddam (non-dynastic, former governor of Damascus), appointed by Saladin, 1175–1178
Turan-Shah, brother of Saladin, 1178–1179
Farrukh Shah, nephew of Saladin, 1179–1182
Bahram Shah, son of Farrukh Shah, 1182–1230
Al-Ashraf Musa, son of al-Adil I, 1230–1237
As-Salih Ismail, brother of al-Ashraf Musa, 1237–1246
Saʿd al-Din al-Humaidi (non-dynastic, appointed by as-Salih Ayyub), 1246–1249
Al-Muazzam Turanshah, son of al-Salih Ayyub, 1249–1250
An-Nasir Yusuf, as sultan of Aleppo and Damascus, son of al-Aziz Muhammad, 1250–1260.

Takeover by Mongols, and then Mamluks following the battle of Ain Jalut, 1260.

Emirs of Hama
See Hama, Muslim Rule.

 Al-Muzaffar I Umar, son of Nur ad-Din Shahanshah (brother of Saladin), 1178–1191
 Al-Mansur I Muhammad, son of al-Muzaffar Umar, 1191–1221
 Al-Nasir Kilij Arslan, son of al-Mansur Muhammad, 1221–1229
 Al-Muzaffar II Mahmud, son of al-Mansur Muhammad, 1229–1244
 Al-Mansur II Muhammad, son of al-Muzaffar II Mahmud, 1244–1284
[Vassals to Mamluk sultans after 1260]
Al-Muzaffar III Mahmud, son of al-Mansur II Muhammad, 1284–1299
[Ruled by emirs of Mamluk sultan al-Nasir Muhammad, 1299–1310]
Abu al-Fida, son of Malik ul-Afdal (brother of al-Mansur II Muhammad), 1310–1332
Al-Afdal Muhammad, son of Abu al-Fida, 1332–1341.

Formal takeover by Mamluk sultanate in 1341.

Emirs of Homs
See Homs, Seljuk, Ayyubid and Mamluk Rule.

 Muhammad ibn Shirkuh, son of Shirkuh (uncle of Saladin), 1178–1186
 Al-Mujahid Shirkuh, son of Muhammad ibn Shirkuh, 1186–1240
 Al-Mansur Ibrahim, son of al-Mujahid Shirkuh, 1240–1246
 Al-Ashraf Musa, son of al-Mansur Ibrahim, 1246–1248 (Homs), 1248–1260 (Tell Bashir)
An-Nasir Yusuf, as sultan of Aleppo and Damascus, son of al-Aziz Muhammad, 1250–1260
Al-Ashraf Musa (second rule), 1260–1263.

Directly ruled by Mamluks under Alam al-Din Sanjar al-Bashqirdi, assigned by Baibars, sultan of Egypt and Syria, from 1263.

Emirs of Hisn Kaifa
See Hisn Kaifa, Ayyubid and Mongols.

As-Salih Ayyub, son of al-Kamil, 1232–1239
Al-Mu'azzam Turanshah, son of as-Salih Ayyub, 1239–1249
Muwahhid Taqiyya ad-Din Abdullah, son of al-Mu'azzam Turanshah, 1249–1294
Kamil Ahmad I, 1294–1325
Adil Mujir ad-Din Muhammad, 1325–1328
Adil Shahab ad-Din, 1328–1349 (Meinecke gives this ruler as al-ʿĀdil Ghāzī, 1341–1367)
Salih Abu-Bakr Khalil I, 1349–1378
Adil Fakhr ad-Din Sulayman I, 1378-1432 (Meinecke gives this ruler as al-ʿĀdil Sulaimān, 1377–1424)
Ashraf Sharaf ad Din, 1432–1433
Salih Salah ad-Din, 1433–1452
Kamil Ahmad II, 1452–1455
Adil Khalif, 1455–1462
Salih Khalil II, 1482–1511
Adil Sulayman II, 1511–1514
Salih Khalil II (second rule), 1514–1520
Malik Hussayn, 1520–1521
Adil Sulayman II (second rule), 1521–1524.

Takeover by the Ottoman Empire in 1524.

Emirs of al-Karak
Also referred to as governors of Transjordan.  See al-Karak, Crusader, Ayyubid and Mamluk Periods.

Saladin, 1188
Al-Adil I, brother of Saladin, 1188-1193
Al-Mu'azzam Isa, son of al-Adil I, 1193–1227
An-Nasir Dawud, son of al-Mu'azzam Isa, 1229–1249
Al-Mughith 'Umar, son of al-Adil II, 1249–1263.

Taken by Mamluks under Baibars, sultan of Egypt and Syria, in 1263.

Emirs of Diyar Bakr 
See Diyar Bakr.

Saladin, 1185–1193
Al-Adil I, brother of Saladin, 1193–1200
Al-Awhad Ayyub, son of al-Adil I, 1200–1210
Al-Ashraf Musa, son of al-Adil I, 1210–1220
Al-Muzaffar Ghazi, son of al-Adil I, 1220–1244
Al-Kamil (II) Muhammad, son of al-Muzaffar Ghazi, 1244–1260.

Taken by Mongols in 1260.

Emirs of Yemen and Hejaz
See Yemen, Ayyubid Conquest.

Turan-Shah, brother of Saladin, 1173–1181
Tughtakin ibn Ayyub, brother of Saladin, 1181–1197
Al-Mu'izz Fath ud-Din Isma'il, son of Tughtakin ibn Ayyub, 1197–1202
An-Nasir Muhammed ibn Tughtakin ibn Ayyub, son of Tughtakin ibn Ayyub, 1202–1214
Al-Muzaffar Sulayman, son of Al-Mansur I Muhammad, 1214–1215
Al-Mas'ud Yusuf, son of Al-Kamil, 1215–1229.

Takeover by Rasulid dynasty of Yemen in 1229.

Emirs of Banyas
See Banyas.

 Al-Aziz 'Uthman, son of al-Adil I 1218–1232.
 Al-Zahir Ghazi, son of al-'Aziz 'Uthman 1232–1232.
 Al-Sa'id Hasan, son of al-'Aziz 'Uthman 1232–1247.
 As-Salih Ayyub, son of al-Kamil (dependency of Egypt) 1247–1249.
 An-Nasir Yusuf, son of al-Aziz Muhammad (dependency of Damascus) 1250-?.
 Al-Sa'id Hasan b.  al-'Aziz (second reign;  d. 658) 1260–1260.

References

Sources

Ayyubid dynasty
Ayyubid
Ayyubid dynasty